The men's bi-fins 50 m event in finswimming at the 2017 World Games took place on 22 July 2017 at the Orbita Indoor Swimming Pool in Wrocław, Poland.

Competition format
A total of 8 athletes entered the competition. Only final was held.

Results

Final

References 

Finswimming at the 2017 World Games
2017 World Games